Shirin Nazem or Sherin Nazim is a village is Badakhshan Province, Afghanistan. It was hit by an avalanche in 2012 that killed 37 people.

See also
Badakhshan Province

References

Populated places in Badakhshan Province